Sulfanitran is a sulfonamide antibiotic which is used in the poultry industry. It is a component of Novastat, Polystat, and Unistat, brand names of feed additives for chickens used to control Coccidioides spp.

References

Sulfonamide antibiotics
Veterinary drugs